Plutonium-244 (244Pu) is an isotope of plutonium that has a half-life of 80 million years. This is longer than any of the other isotopes of plutonium and longer than any other actinide isotope except for the three naturally abundant ones: uranium-235 (704 million years), uranium-238 (4.468 billion years), and thorium-232 (14.05 billion years). Although studies are in conflict, given the mathematics of the decay of plutonium-244, an exceedingly small amount should still be present in the Earth's composition, making plutonium a likely although unproven candidate as the shortest lived primordial element.

Natural occurrence
Accurate measurements, beginning in the early 1970s, have detected primordial plutonium-244, making it the shortest-lived primordial nuclide. The amount of 244Pu in the pre-Solar nebula (4.57×109 years ago) was estimated as 0.8% the amount of 238U. As the age of the Earth is about 57 half-lives of 244Pu, the amount of plutonium-244 left should be very small; Hoffman et al. estimated its content in the rare-earth mineral bastnasite as  = 1.0×10−18 g/g, which corresponded to the content in the Earth crust as low as 3×10−25 g/g (i.e. the total mass of plutonium-244 in Earth's crust is about 9 g). Since plutonium-244 cannot be easily produced by natural neutron capture in the low neutron activity environment of uranium ores (see below), its presence cannot plausibly be explained by any other means than creation by r-process nucleosynthesis in supernovae or neutron star mergers. Plutonium-244 thus should be the second shortest-lived (after samarium-146) and the heaviest primordial isotope yet detected or theoretically predicted.

Trace amounts of 244Pu (that arrived on Earth within the last 10 million years) were found in rock from the Pacific ocean by a Japanese oil exploration company.

The detection of primordial 244Pu in 1971 is not confirmed by recent, more sensitive measurements using the method of accelerator mass spectrometry. In this study, no traces of plutonium-244 in the samples of bastnasite (taken from the same mine as in the early study) were observed, so only an upper limit on the 244Pu content was obtained:  < 0.15×10−18 g/g, which is 370 (or less) atoms per gram of the sample, at least 7 times lower than the abundance measured by Hoffman et al.

Live interstellar plutonium-244 has been detected in meteorite dust in marine sediments, although the levels detected are much lower than would be expected from current modelling of the in-fall from the interstellar medium.  It is important to recall, however, that in order to be a primordial nuclide – one constituting the amalgam orbiting the Sun that ultimately coalesced into the Earth – that plutonium-244 must have comprised some of the solar nebula, rather than having been replenished by extrasolar meteoritic dust.  The presence of plutonium-244 in meteoritic composition without evidence the meteor originated from the formational disc of the Solar System supports the hypothesis that 244Pu was abundant enough to have been a part of that disc, if an extrasolar meteor contained it in some other gravitationally supported system, but such a meteor cannot prove the hypothesis. Only the unlikely discovery of live 244Pu within the Earth's composition could do that.

As an extinct radionuclide

Plutonium-244 is one of several extinct radionuclides that preceded the formation of the Solar System. Its half-life of 80 million years ensured its circulation across the solar system before its extinction, and indeed, 244Pu has not yet been found in matter other than meteorites. Radionuclides such as 244Pu undergo decay to produce fissiogenic (i.e., arising from fission) xenon isotopes that can then be used to time the events of the early solar system. In fact, by analyzing data from Earth's mantle which indicates that about 30% of the existing fissiogenic xenon is attributable to 244Pu decay, the timing of Earth's formation can be inferred to have occurred nearly 50–70 million years following the formation of the Solar System.

Preceding the analysis of mass spectra data obtained by analyzing samples found in meteorites, it was inferential at best to accredit 244Pu as being the nuclide responsible for the fissiogenic xenon found. However, an analysis of a laboratory sample of 244Pu compared with that of fissiogenic xenon gathered from the meteorites Pasamonte and Kapoeta produced matching spectra that immediately left little doubt as to the source of the isotopic xenon anomalies. Spectra data was further acquired for another actinide isotope, 244Cm, but such data proved contradictory and helped erase further doubts that the fission was appropriately attributed to 244Pu.

Both the examination of spectra data and study of fission tracks led to several findings of plutonium-244. In Western Australia, the analysis of the mass spectrum of xenon within 4.1–4.2 billion-year-old zircons was met with findings of diverse levels of 244Pu fission. Presence of 244Pu fission tracks can be established by using the initial ratio of 244Pu to 238U (Pu/U)0 at a time T0 =  years, when Xe formation first began in meteorites, and by considering how the ratio of Pu/U fission tracks varies over time. Examination of a whitlockite crystal within a lunar rock specimen brought over from the Apollo 14 mission established proportions of Pu/U fission tracks consistent with the (Pu/U)0 time dependence.

Production
Unlike plutonium-238, plutonium-239, plutonium-240, plutonium-241, and plutonium-242, plutonium-244 is not produced in quantity by the nuclear fuel cycle, because further neutron capture on plutonium-242 produces plutonium-243 which has a short half-life (5 hours) and quickly beta decays to americium-243 before having much opportunity to further capture neutrons in any but very high neutron flux environments.  The global inventory of 244Pu is roughly 20 grams.  Plutonium-244 is also a minor constituent of thermonuclear fallout, with a global 244Pu/239Pu fallout ratio of (5.7 ± 1.0) × 10−5.

Applications
Plutonium-244 is used as an internal standard for isotope dilution mass spectrometry analysis of plutonium.

References 

Actinides
Nuclear materials
Isotopes of plutonium